Mission Ranjan Das is a Bharatiya Janata Party politician from Assam. He has been elected in Assam Legislative Assembly election in 1991, 2000, 2001 and 2006 from Karimganj North constituency. Currently, he is the chairman of Assam State Transport Corporation.

References 

Living people
Bharatiya Janata Party politicians from Assam
Assam MLAs 1991–1996
Assam MLAs 1996–2001
Assam MLAs 2001–2006
Assam MLAs 2006–2011
People from Karimganj district
Year of birth missing (living people)